Margaret Beaufort ( 1437 – 1474) was a daughter of Edmund Beaufort, 2nd Duke of Somerset and Lady Eleanor Beauchamp.

Her maternal grandparents were Richard de Beauchamp, 13th Earl of Warwick and his first wife Elizabeth Beauchamp, 4th Baroness Lisle. Elizabeth was daughter of Thomas de Berkeley, 5th Baron Berkeley and Margaret de Berkeley, 3rd Baroness Lisle, becoming the main heiress of her mother.

Marriages 

Margaret's father led forces loyal to the House of Lancaster in the First Battle of St Albans (22 May 1455) against his main rival Richard Plantagenet, 3rd Duke of York. Henry Stafford followed his father-in-law into battle. Margaret's father was killed; her husband, Stafford, was wounded. Margaret could no longer count on the support of her father. She became a widow when her husband died of plague three years later.

Ancestry

Sources 
Weir, Alison. Britain's Royal Families: The Complete Genealogy. London: Vintage Books, 2008. .

1420s births
1474 deaths
British courtesy countesses
Margaret Beaufort, Countess of Stafford
Margaret
15th-century English women
15th-century English people
Daughters of English dukes